Evelyn Vieira de Oliveira (born 17 August 1987) is a Brazilian Paralympic boccia player . 

She won a gold medal at the 2016 Summer Paralympics in Rio de Janeiro,  in the bocce BC3 mixed doubles, with Antônio Leme and Evani Soares da Silva . She competed in Individual BC3, but was eliminated in the Quarter-finals.

She competed at the 2020 Summer Paralympics in Boccia at the Mixed individual BC3, but was eliminated in the quarterfinals.

References 

Living people
1987 births
People from Suzano
Paralympic boccia players of Brazil
Boccia players at the 2016 Summer Paralympics
Boccia players at the 2020 Summer Paralympics
Medalists at the 2016 Summer Paralympics
Medalists at the 2019 Parapan American Games
Paralympic gold medalists for Brazil